Pablo Damián Oro (born 9 August 2002) is an Argentine professional footballer who plays as a forward for Huracán.

Club career
Oro joined Huracán in 2016. Up until June 2019, the forward would score forty-nine goals across their academy. A year prior, in June 2018, he signed a five-year contract with the club; with a $20,000,000 release clause, which was a record for Huracán at that time. The contract length was later shortened to three years due to administrative requirements. Oro moved into Israel Damonte's first-team squad in 2020, notably appearing on the bench for a Copa Sudamericana encounter against Atlético Nacional on 19 February. Oro's senior debut arrived on 13 December against Independiente in the Copa de la Liga Profesional.

International career
In 2018, Oro received numerous call-ups from the Argentina U17s. He appeared in friendlies with the United States and Vélez Sarsfield, notably netting twice against the latter.

Career statistics
.

Notes

References

External links

2002 births
Living people
People from San Luis, Argentina
Argentine footballers
Argentina youth international footballers
Association football forwards
Argentine Primera División players
Club Atlético Huracán footballers